Quasimode is a four-piece jazz band formed in Tokyo in 2002. Their sound is influenced by the cool jazz of the 1950s and 1960s.

They recorded their album The Land of Freedom with guest vocalist Carmen Lundy.

Discography
 2006 Oneself-likeness
 2007 The Land of Freedom
 2008 Straight to the Land of Freedom: Live at Liquidroom
 2008 Sounds of Peace
 2009 Mode of Blue
 2009 Golden Works
 2010 Daybreak
 2011 Magic Ensemble
 2012 Four Pieces: The Best Selection
 2013 Soul Cookin' 
 2014 My Favorite Songs

References

Japanese jazz ensembles
Musical groups from Tokyo